Katra Bazar is a constituency of the Uttar Pradesh Legislative Assembly covering the city of Katra Bazar in the Gonda district of Uttar Pradesh, India.

Katra Bazar is one of five assembly constituencies in the Kaiserganj Lok Sabha constituency. Since 2008, this assembly constituency is numbered 297 amongst 403 constituencies.

Election results

2022

2017
Bharatiya Janta Party candidate Bawan Singh won in last Assembly election of 2017 Uttar Pradesh Legislative Elections defeating Samajwadi Party candidate Baij Nath by a margin of 30,811 votes. Currently Mr. Muzibul Hasan (Subrati) is chairman of Katra Bazar nagar palika. In Katra Bazar there is a police station as well as government hospital, also there is government school named Bhartiya Inter College Katra Bazar in which more than 1500 students are currently studying.

References

External links
 

Assembly constituencies of Uttar Pradesh